Alberto Adão Campos Miguel (born 6 December 1997), commonly known as Além, is an Angolan footballer who currently plays as a midfielder for 1º de Agosto.

Career statistics

Club

Notes

International

References

1997 births
Living people
Angolan footballers
Angola international footballers
Association football midfielders
Atlético Petróleos de Luanda players
Progresso Associação do Sambizanga players
Girabola players
People from Luanda
Angola A' international footballers
2022 African Nations Championship players